Rebecca Marino was the defending champion, but chose not to participate.
Romina Oprandi won the title, defeating Varvara Lepchenko in the final.

Seeds

Main draw

Finals

Top half

Bottom half

References
 Main Draw
 Qualifying Draw

USTA Tennis Classic of Troy - Singles